The Dionne quintuplets (born May 28, 1934) are the first quintuplets known to have survived their infancy. The identical girls were born just outside Callander, Ontario, near the village of Corbeil. All five survived to adulthood.

The Dionne girls were premature. After four months with their family, custody was signed over to the Red Cross who paid for their care and oversaw the building of a hospital for the sisters. Less than a year after this agreement was signed, the Ontario government stepped in and passed the Dionne Quintuplets' Guardianship Act, 1935 which made them wards of the Crown until the age of 18. The Ontario provincial government and those around them began to profit by making them a significant tourist attraction.

The identical quintuplet girls were, in order of birth:

 Yvonne Édouilda Marie Dionne (died 2001)
 Annette Lillianne Marie Allard (living)
 Cécile Marie Émilda Langlois (living)
 Émilie Marie Jeanne Dionne (died 1954)
 Marie Reine Alma Houle (died 1970)

Family
The Dionne family was headed by father Oliva-Édouard (1904–1979) and mother Elzire Dionne (1909–1986), who married on September 15, 1925. They lived just outside Corbeil, in a farmhouse in unregistered territory.  The Dionnes were a French-speaking farming family with five older children, Ernest (1926–1995), Rose Marie (1928–1995), Thérèse (1929–2021), Daniel (1932–1995), and Pauline (1933–2018), who was only eleven months older than the quintuplets. A sixth child, Léo (1930-1930), died of pneumonia shortly after birth.

The Dionnes also had three sons after the quintuplets: Oliva Jr. (1936–2017), Victor (1938–2007), and Claude (1946–2009).

Birth
Elzire was 24 when she gave birth to the quintuplets. She suspected she was carrying twins, but no one was aware that quintuplets were even possible. The quintuplets were born premature. In 1938, the doctors had a theory that was later proven correct when genetic tests showed that the girls were identical, meaning they were created from a single egg cell. Elzire reported having cramps in her third month and passing a strange object which may have been a sixth fetus.

Dr. Allan Roy Dafoe is credited with ensuring the successful live birth of the quintuplets. Originally, he diagnosed Elzire with a "fetal abnormality".  He delivered the babies with the help of two midwives, Aunt Donalda and Madame Benoît Lebel, who were summoned by Oliva Dionne in the middle of the night.

Émilie and Marie shared an embryonic sac, Annette and Yvonne shared an embryonic sac, and it is believed that Cécile shared an embryonic sac with the miscarried sixth baby. All but Émilie were later discovered to be right-handed and all but Marie had a counterclockwise whorl in their hair.

The quintuplets' total weight at birth was 13 pounds, 6 ounces (6.07 kg). The highest weight was 3 pounds 4 ounces and the lowest weight was 2 pounds 4 ounces. Their individual weights and measurements were not recorded. The quintuplets were immediately wrapped in cotton sheets and old napkins, and laid in the corner of the bed. Elzire went into shock, but she recovered in two hours.

The babies were kept in a wicker basket borrowed from the neighbours, covered with heated blankets. They were taken into the kitchen and set by the open door of the stove to keep warm. One by one, they were taken out of the basket and massaged with olive oil. Every two hours for the first twenty-four, they were fed water sweetened with corn syrup. By the second day they were moved to a slightly larger laundry basket and kept warm with hot-water bottles. They were watched constantly and often had to be roused. They were then fed with "seven-twenty" formula: cow's milk, boiled water, two spoonfuls of corn syrup, and one or two drops of rum for a stimulant.

News of the unusual birth spread quickly, sparked by Oliva's brother's inquiry to the local newspaper editor about how much he would charge for an announcement of five babies at a single birth. Before long, people from all over North America were offering assistance. Individuals sent supplies and well-meant advice (a famous letter from Appalachia recommends tiny doses of burnt rye whisky to prevent diarrhea); one hospital sent two incubators. Assistance was also offered by women who donated their breast milk to the quintuplets. The women were compensated for their donations, receiving ten cents per ounce of milk donated. This allowed women to help with household income during the Great Depression. Once the milk was received, it was preserved and sent by train to the quintuplets. Dr. Alan Brown of Toronto's Hospital for Sick Children ensured that a train with twenty-eight ounces of breast milk was delivered to the quintuplets each morning.

Removal from family

Oliva Dionne was approached by fair exhibitors for Chicago's Century of Progress exhibition within days of the girls' birth, seeking to put the quintuplets on display and show them to the world. (At the time it was not unusual for so-called "incubator babies" to be displayed at fairs and other exhibitions.) The parents were persuaded to agree on the advice of the doctor present at the birth, Dr. Dafoe, and the family priest, Father Daniel Routhier.

Although Oliva Dionne revoked the contract only days later citing that his wife, Elzire Dionne, did not sign it and therefore it didn't make the contract valid, the Tour Bureau claimed otherwise. On approximately July 27, 1934, the first guardianship bill was signed. Oliva and Elzire Dionne signed custody of the quintuplets over to the Red Cross for a period of two years to protect them from this contract and in return the Red Cross would cover all medical costs. This included the nurses' wages, supplies, and ensuring that enough breast milk was shipped to the hospital. They also oversaw the building of a hospital built specifically for the Dionne quintuplets. In February 1935 the Dionnes travelled to Chicago as "Parents of the World Famous Babies" and made stage appearances. The Premier of Ontario at the time, Mitchell Hepburn, used the Dionne vaudeville trip as an excuse to extend the guardianship. He claimed that they must save the babies from further exploitation and, in March 1935, pushed the Dionne Quintuplets Act through government that officially made the girls wards of the Crown and extended guardianship to the age of eighteen. Although Oliva Dionne had a seat on the Board of Guardians, he rarely attended meetings as he felt his vote wouldn't matter against the other three guardians: Dr. Dafoe, Joseph Valin and Minister of Welfare David Croll. These three guardians met once a month and had full control over business matters involving the quintuplets. They were involved in caring for the girls, managing money, and creating contracts for business opportunities such as appearances in films and commercials. The stated reason for removing the quintuplets from their parents' legal custody was to ensure their survival and protection from promoters.

The government realized there was enormous public interest in the sisters and proceeded to engender a tourist industry around them. The girls were made wards of the provincial Crown, planned until they reached the age of 18.

Dafoe Nursery
Across the road from their birthplaces, the Dafoe Hospital and Nursery was built for the five girls and their new caregivers. The girls were moved from the farmhouse to this nursery on September 21, 1934, and lived there until they were nine years old. The compound had an outdoor playground designed to be a public observation area. It was surrounded by a covered arcade, which allowed tourists to observe the sisters behind one-way screens. The one-way screens were installed to prevent noise and distraction. The facility was funded by a Red Cross fundraiser. The sisters were brought to the playground two or three times a day in front of the crowd. It was a nine-room nursery with a staff house nearby. The staff house held the three nurses and the three police in charge of guarding them, while a housekeeper and two maids lived in the main building with the quintuplets. The buildings were surrounded by a seven-foot (2.13 m) barbed-wire fence.

The Dionne sisters were constantly tested, studied, and examined, with records taken of everything. While living at the compound, they had a somewhat rigid lifestyle. They were not required to participate in chores and were privately tutored in the same building where they lived. Cared for primarily by nurses, they had limited exposure to the world outside the boundaries of the compound except for the daily rounds of tourists, who, from the sisters' point of view, were generally heard but not seen. They also had occasional contact with their parents and siblings across the road. When their parents were allowed in the nursery, they argued with the nurses. Elzire pushed the nurses and objected to the foods that they were fed. Every morning they dressed together in a big bathroom, drank orange juice and cod liver oil, then had their hair curled. They then said a prayer, a gong sounded, and they ate breakfast in the dining room. After 30 minutes, they cleared the table. They then played in the sunroom for 30 minutes, took a 15-minute break, and at nine o'clock had their morning inspection with Dr. Dafoe. Every month, they had a different timetable of activities. They bathed every day before dinner and put on their pyjamas. Dinner was served at precisely six o'clock. They then went into the quiet playroom to say their evening prayers. Each girl had a colour and a symbol to mark whatever belonged to her. Annette's colour was red and her design a maple leaf, Cécile's green and a turkey. Émilie had white and a tulip, Marie blue and a teddy bear, and Yvonne pink and a bluebird.

Up until the quintuplet's birth, Dafoe was a country doctor. He received additional attention when he delivered the quintuplets and was seen as a doctor having much knowledge on child care and health. Up until 1942 when Dafoe retired, he was known as the world's best doctor. He wrote a book, numerous pamphlets, and had a radio broadcast all with the intention of helping mothers with infant care. His broadcasts were sponsored by companies and brands such as Lysol wipes, which were seen as effective at preventing infections for newborn babies. Mothers were highly appreciative of Dr. Dafoe's advice as they were actively looking for advice from professionals in the health care or child care fields. Eventually Dafoe was viewed as taking advantage of his new come fame. He spent much money and was removed as one of the three primary caretakers of the quintuplets. This removal involved Oliva Dionne as he took legal action to regain custody over his children. The general public did not know Dafoe profited $182,466 in 1943, which is equivalent to millions of dollars today.

When visits first started, the visitors watched the quintuplets through a window in the hospital. The hospital quickly realized that this was not good for the quintuplets as they were excited when visitors came and became irritated when they left. Telling visitors not to make loud noises was not enough to prevent them from doing so. They were displayed four times a day. The observatory opened on Canada Day in 1936. Thousands of tourists came to see the sisters and hundreds of cars flooded in. The visitors were told to stay silent and not speak to the girls, continue moving to avoid blockages, if the weather was bad the girls would not be shown, and no photographs were allowed to be taken. The girls knew they were watched as they could hear screams and laughter. The one-way screens did not fully block out the visitors, acting more as frosted glass.

Approximately 3,000 people per day visited the observation gallery that surrounded the outdoor playground to view the Dionne sisters. Ample parking was provided and almost 3,000,000 people walked through the gallery between 1936 and 1943. Oliva Dionne ran a souvenir shop and a woollen store opposite the nursery and the area acquired the name "Quintland". The souvenirs, picturing the five sisters, included autographs and framed photographs, spoons, cups, plates, plaques, candy bars, books, postcards, and dolls. Available to the public for free in bins were stones from the area that claimed to have the magical power of fertility – the bins would need to be refilled almost every day. Plus, women without children touched Oliva Dionne as they believed that he could increase their chances of fertility. Midwives Madame LeGros and Madame Lebel worked at five different souvenir shops at different times. The quintuplets brought in more than $50 million in total tourist revenue to Ontario. Quintland became Ontario's biggest tourist attraction of the era, surpassing the Canadian side of Niagara Falls. It was only rivalled by Radio City Music Hall, Mount Vernon, and Gettysburg in the United States. Hollywood stars who came to Callander to visit the Quints included Clark Gable, James Stewart, Bette Davis, James Cagney, and Mae West. Amelia Earhart also visited Callander just six weeks before her ill-fated flight in 1937. Only five people could be in a room with the quintuplets at one time. These individuals were sprayed with disinfectant.

The sisters, their likenesses and images, along with Dr. Dafoe, were used to publicize commercial products including Karo corn syrup, Quaker Oats, Lysol, Palmolive soap, Colgate, Aluminum Goods Manufacturing Co., Beehive Corn Syrup, Canada Starch Company, Carnation Milk, Colgate-Palmolive-Peet Co., Corn Products Refining and Crown Brand Corn Syrup, and Baby Ruth. They promoted the sales of condensed milk, toothpaste, disinfectant, candy bars and many other products.

Film careers
The Dionne girls starred in three Hollywood feature films, which were essentially fictionalized versions of their story. They played the "Wyatt quintuplets" in all three films:
 The Country Doctor (1936) – directed by Henry King and starring Jean Hersholt as "Dr. John Luke"
 Reunion (1936) – directed by Norman Taurog and starring Hersholt
 Five of a Kind (1938) – directed by Herbert Leeds and starring Hersholt, as well as Claire Trevor and Cesar Romero as competitive radio journalists

In the first two films, the Dionne quintuplets didn't so much act as simply appear. Their scenes were filmed at Quintland in Callander, and largely consisted of them playing and interacting with each other, as one would expect of normal 2- and 4-year-old children.  Both films concentrated more on telling the (fictionalized) story of the heroic doctor who delivered the Wyatts and took care of them, than it did on the Wyatt quintuplets themselves.

The Dionne quintuplets also appeared in numerous newsreels and a short documentary film called Five Times Five in 1939.  This film was nominated for an Academy Award for Best Short Subject (Two-reel) in 1940. In 1942, they appeared in one of James A. Fitzpatrick's Traveltalks Land of the Quintuplets shortly before they were returned to their parents.  In 1998, the three surviving sisters, Cécile, Annette and Yvonne, participated in an hour-long documentary, "Full Circle: The Untold Story of the Dionne Quintuplets", written and directed by Maya Gallus, and broadcast on the CBC documentary series Life & Times.

Trust fund 
The quintuplet's trust fund grew rapidly with each newspaper and newsreel that shared their name. In 1934, a photographer from the Toronto Star, Fred Davis signed a contract stating that the $10,000 the Newspaper Enterprise Association put into the trust fund disallows anyone else from photographing the quintuplets for a year, including their parents. Each newsreel that Pathé News made meant that a deposit between $12,000 to $15,000 was made in the trust fund. The Madame Alexander Doll Company offered the quintuplets five percent of its total sales ($25,000) as many people bought dolls that resembled the quintuplets, especially during Christmas. By their second birthday, their bank account had $250,000.

Although the quintuplet's trust fund was secured by the Canadian government, they were not rich nor living comfortably. They were making $746 monthly. The money in their trust fund decreased through spending on marriage, houses, child support, and divorce. It was discovered that their trust fund contained less money than what was made from advertisements and photographs of the quintuplets. Instead of the government paying for research, food, and travel expenses for photographers and filmmakers, the payment came from the quintuplet's trust fund. When the sisters released their book revealing the harsh memories from their childhood, the government was unmoved. They did not consider the suffering their actions caused and their impact on the quintuplet's childhood. The sisters requested $10 million from the Canadian government and received no response. With the help of Bertrand (Cecile's son), news released that documents concerning the quintuplets from 1934 to 1937 were burned. After this news released, $2000 per month was offered to the three living sisters by Premier Mike Harris. The sisters believed this offer was an insult to them and could not pay off the damage that had been done. They just wanted what was stolen from their trust fund. They took their need to media. The sisters turned down offers of 2 and 3 million dollars. They accepted 4 million dollars and an analysis of their trust accounts. Harris visited the sisters and apologized on behalf of the government. The quintuplets had finally put their story in the public's eye and challenged the Ontario government.

Return to family

By 1939 Dr. Dafoe had resigned as guardian and Oliva Dionne was gaining more support to have his family reunited. The family was reunited because their parents made efforts to regain custody over their children. Also, the Catholic Church and French-speaking communities in both Quebec and Ontario pressured the government to give Oliva Dionne custody. These efforts and pressure stemmed from the fact that the Dionnes had never agreed to the removal of the quintuplets from their custody. In 1942, the Dionne family moved into the nursery with the quintuplets while they waited for their new home to be completed. In November 1943, the entire Dionne family moved into their new home. The yellow brick, 20-room mansion was paid for out of the quintuplets' fund. The home had many amenities that were considered luxuries at the time, including telephones, electricity and hot water and was nicknamed "The Big House".  The building is now a retirement home.

The nursery was eventually converted into an accredited school house where the sisters finished their secondary education along with ten Roman Catholic girls from the area who were chosen to attend. In later years, the old Dafoe Hospital was used by the Recluses of Corbeil as a convent.

When they were reunited, many struggles followed. They were not one big happy family and the quintuplets felt distanced from their siblings. They struggled to communicate as they spoke French and their siblings preferred English. Once Oliva received custody, he wanted the attention. He made police accompany his vehicle as he took the quintuplets out, constantly drawing attention to them and himself.

While the parents claimed that they wished to integrate the quintuplets into the family, the sisters frequently travelled to perform at various functions, and still dressed identically. According to the accounts of the surviving sisters, the parents often treated them at home as a five-part unit, and frequently lectured them about the trouble they had caused the family by existing. They claimed physical abuse at the hands of their mother. They were unaware for many years that the lavish house, the expensive food and the series of cars the family enjoyed were paid for with money they themselves had earned, but they were aware of the fact that their upbringing meant they would never feel truly part of the large Dionne family, and called their time in the Big House, "the saddest home we ever knew".

In particular, Oliva Dionne was resentful and suspicious of outsiders as a result of his having lost custody of the girls. In 1995, the three surviving sisters alleged that their father had sexually abused them during their teenage years. Their father violated them. He bought liniment claiming it would help with Yvonne's chest cold. As a 13-year-old she felt pressured to undress in front of her father. Her father rubbed the liniment on her neck, sternum, shoulders, and ribs. Then, he turned to Emilie and told her he needed to apply the liniment on her too. The quintuplets feared going for car drives with their father and felt the need to dress extra conservatively on these drives because of him. Annette wore turtlenecks to prevent her father from violating her. During car rides the girls were squished up front with their father as the back seats were in for repair. He allegedly French kissed them and put his fingers down their blouses.

Adult years
The quintuplets left the family home upon turning 18 years old in 1952 and had little contact with their parents afterwards. Three went on to marry and have children: Marie had two daughters, Annette had three sons, and Cécile had five children, including one who died in infancy and twins Bruno and Bertrand.  Émilie devoted her brief life to becoming a nun. Yvonne finished nursing school before turning to sculpting, then later becoming a librarian. Émilie died at the age of 20 as a result of a seizure. She had a series of seizures while she was a postulant at a convent and had asked not to be left unattended, but the nun who was supposed to be watching her thought she was asleep and went to Mass. Émilie had another seizure, rolled onto her belly and, unable to raise her face from her pillow, accidentally suffocated. In 1970, Marie was living alone in an apartment and her sisters were worried after not hearing from her in several days. Her doctor went to her home and found her in bed, Marie having been dead for days. A blood clot was found on her brain.

Annette and Cécile both eventually divorced and by the 1990s, the three surviving sisters lived together in the Montreal suburb of Saint-Bruno-de-Montarville.

In 1965, author James Brough wrote a book, in cooperation with the then four surviving sisters, called We Were Five. Pierre Berton published a biography called The Dionne Years: A Thirties Melodrama in 1977 and narrated a 1978 National Film Board of Canada documentary. John Nihmey and Stuart Foxman published the fictional Time of Their Lives – The Dionne Tragedy in 1986. Nihmey's and Foxman's book was the basis for the 1994 TV miniseries Million Dollar Babies, produced by CBC and CBS and starring Beau Bridges, Roy Dupuis and Céline Bonnier.

In 1997, the three surviving sisters wrote an open letter to the parents of the McCaughey septuplets, warning against allowing too much publicity for the children, after which they reached a $4 million settlement with the Ontario government as compensation for their exploitation.

, there are two surviving sisters, Annette and Cécile. Yvonne died in 2001.

Museums

The original family homestead was moved around 1960 to a location on Highway 11B (near the present Clarion Resort), and again in 1985 to North Bay and converted into the non-profit Dionne Quintuplets Museum. The museum was first located at the intersection of Highway 11 and the Trans Canada Highway and features many artifacts from the quints' early days and their growing years. , the museum closed, and the city of North Bay was considering selling the building as surplus, though a petition was circulated by citizens to have it designated and preserved as a historical structure. In 2017, plans surfaced for the city to sell the building, and relocate it to a fairground in the village of Sundridge 75 km south of North Bay. On November 9, 2017, the City of North Bay announced plans to move the house on November 19 to a new site in downtown North Bay (on Oak Street in a vacant area between Marina Point Retirement Residence and Discovery North Bay Museum, a former CPR Station c. 1903) and reopened in spring 2019.

A second museum, the Callander Bay Heritage Museum, also features many artifacts from the Dionne quintuplets and is located in the previous home of Dr. Dafoe.

In popular culture

In the short story "Mandarin Jade", Raymond Chandler wrote in Chapter 3 of "an advertising calendar showing the Dionne quintuplets rolling around on a sky-blue floor". In chapter 11 of his 1939 novel The Big Sleep, Chandler described "an advertising calendar showing the Quints rolling around on a sky-blue floor, in pink dresses, with seal-brown hair and sharp black eyes as large as mammoth prunes".

Canadian mystery writer Louise Penny said the fictional Ouellet quintuplets in her book How The Light Gets In "were certainly inspired by the Dionne girls".

In the 1935 film A Night at the Opera, Chico makes an oblique reference to the quintuplets, when he says that "duplicates" are "those five kids up in Canada".

In the 1936 film My Man Godfrey, Angelica Bullock, played by Alice Brady, references the Dionne quintuplets with the line, "If a woman in Canada can have five children, why can't Godfrey?"

In the 1937 British comedy film Oh, Mr Porter!, Will Hay's character "Porter" puns on "Murphy" telling him his wife's had quinsy (a complication of tonsillitis), replying "What, like that woman in Canada?"

In the 1939 film The Women, Joan Crawford's character Crystal Allen schemes to convince her boyfriend of her domestic skills. Her friend jokingly asks her, "Why don't you borrow the quintuplets for the evening?"

In the 1941 film Dumbo, a musical number, titled "Look Out for Mr. Stork", contains lyrics mentioning "those quintuplets and the woman in the shoe".

In the 1944 film The Miracle of Morgan's Creek, an American girl has six boys. The news makes headlines around the world. A newspaper headline is shown: "Canada Demands Recount".

In the 1945 film Duffy's Tavern, Archie played by Ed Gardner, asks another character (Ms. Duffy), "what else did you see while you were up there [in Canada], did you see the, uh, quintuplets?!"

In the 1946 Looney Tunes cartoon Baby Bottleneck, Daffy Duck is shown taking phone calls from a handful of celebrity fathers including Eddie Cantor, Bing Crosby and Oliva Dionne (who is quickly dismissed by Daffy with a curt "Mr. Dionne, puh-lease!").

Stephen Sondheim referenced the quintuplets in his song "I'm Still Here" from the musical Follies with the line "I got through Abie's Irish Rose, five Dionne babies, Major Bowes ...".

The fourth episode of the Amazon television series The Marvelous Mrs. Maisel is called "The Disappointment of the Dionne Quintuplets".

Three of the Dionne quintuplets were referenced by Curly Howard in a Three Stooges short entitled "False Alarms", aired August 15, 1936.

In Oily to Bed, Oily to Rise (1939), towards the end of the film, Moe Howard tells Curly to wish for quintuplets and Curly responds that honeymooning in Canada with their new found loves is how to make the wish come true, a reference to the Dionne quintuplets

The publicity around the birth and display of the quintuplets inspired the 1999 episode of The Simpsons, "Eight Misbehavin'.

In 2018, the birth of the quintuplets was named a National Historic Event.

E.L. Doctorow references the quintuplets in his novel World's Fair (1985) in a chapter 2 passage "I don't trust that doctor", she said of the physician attending the Dionne quintuplets. "He likes the limelight too much."

Shelley Wood's novel about the sisters, The Quintland Sisters, was published on March 5, 2019. It is a fictionalized account of the sisters' story from the point of view of one of the midwives' assistants.

Disney: Pluto's Quin-Puplets (1937)the first animated short officially starring Plutowas cleverly created in the wake of the 1930s craze kicked up by the celebrated Dionne quintuplets: Pluto and Fifi are seen as "Mr. And Mrs. Pluto", the parents of five mischievous mini-Plutos.

References

Bibliography
 Translated by Kathe Roth. 
 First edition: Jean-Yves Soucy; avec Annette, Cécile et Yvonne Dionne. Les secrets de famille des soeurs Dionne . Paris: Presses de la Cité. 1996. . .
 James Brough; Marie Dionne; Annette Dionne; Cecile Dionne; Yvonne Dionne. "We were five": the Dionne quintuplets' story from birth through girlhood to womanhood. New York: Simon and Schuster. 1965. .

External links

 Dionne Quints digitized historical information authorized by the sisters, funded by an Ontario grant
 Life and Times: Full Circle: The Untold Story of the Dionne Quintuplets at CBC.ca 
 The Dionne Quints Museum at North Bay & District Chamber of Commerce
 The Dionne Quintuplets at Well Known People Who Happen to be Canadian
 Dionne Quints Ahnentafel– 14 preceding generations from year 1515 
Dionne Quintuplets at The Canadian Encyclopedia
The Dionne Quintuplets at Neonatology on the Web (neonatology.org)
  
 All about the Dionne Quintuplets at the Quintland.com Gallery of Multiples

Media

 Dormant Dionne Virus Flares Blog with several video clips, Part 2, Part 3
 Small collection of "Quintland" videos at YouTube

 
Culture of Northern Ontario
Quintuplets
1934 births
1954 deaths
1970 deaths
2001 deaths
People from Nipissing District
People from Parry Sound District
Franco-Ontarian people
French-Canadian families
Living people
Multiple births